Jean Dunn is an Australian diplomat and a senior career officer with the Department of Foreign Affairs and Trade.

From 2012 to 2016, Dunn was the Australian Ambassador to Poland. Dunn presented her credentials to Polish President Bronisław Komorowski on 17 January 2012.

Prior to her posting to Poland, Dunn was Australian Ambassador to Lebanon from 2009 to 2010 and to Turkey from 2004 to 2007, with earlier postings to South Korea and the United States of America.

Ms. Dunn holds a Bachelor of Arts degree with Honours in Japanese language and politics from Monash University. She has three children.

References

Ambassadors of Australia to Lebanon
Ambassadors of Australia to Poland
Ambassadors of Australia to the Czech Republic
Ambassadors of Australia to Lithuania
Ambassadors of Australia to Turkey
Ambassadors of Australia to Ukraine
Living people
Year of birth missing (living people)
Place of birth missing (living people)
Monash University alumni
Australian women ambassadors